Nicholas "Nick" Clavin (born 1948 in Rahan, County Offaly) is an Irish former sportsperson. He played Gaelic football with his local club St Carthage's and was a member of the Offaly senior inter-county team from 1968 until 1973. He is now pastor of St Gregory the Great Catholic Church in San Diego, California.

References

1948 births
Living people
21st-century Irish Roman Catholic priests
Irish expatriates in the United States
Offaly inter-county Gaelic footballers
St Carthage's Gaelic footballers